The Politics of Hengyang in Hunan province in the People's Republic of China is structured in a dual party-government system like all other governing institutions in mainland China.

The Mayor of Hengyang is the highest-ranking official in the People's Government of Hengyang or Hengyang Municipal Government. However, in the city's dual party-government governing system, the Mayor has less power than the Communist Party of Hengyang Municipal Committee Secretary, colloquially termed the "CPC Party Chief of Hengyang" or "Communist Party Secretary of Hengyang". 

Because of one party dictatorship and no political enemies, Hengyang has become a serious area of corruption. One mayor and three Communist Party Secretaries has been placed under investigation by the Communist Party's anti-corruption agency, the Central Commission for Discipline Inspection.

History
On December 8, 2013, Chen Anzhong was dismissed, arrested and investigated for corruption by the Communist Party's anti-graft watchdog. He is the first prefecture-level official in Hengyang sacked for graft since Xi Jinping's continues an anti-graft dragnet at all levels of government, military and ruling Communist Party.

On December 18, 2013, Tong Mingqian was placed under investigation by the Central Commission for Discipline Inspection of the Communist Party of China for "serious violations of laws and regulations". 

In April 2016, Li Yilong was put under investigation for alleged "serious violations of discipline and laws." by the Central Commission for Discipline Inspection (CCDI).

On November 8, 2016, Zhang Wenxiong was put under investigation for alleged "serious violations of discipline", the Central Commission for Discipline Inspection said in a statement on its website, without elaborating.

List of mayors of Hengyang

List of CPC Party secretaries of Hengyang

References

Hengyang
Hengyang